Hoskins Field may refer to one of the following:

Hoskins Field (Texas), a baseball field
Hoskins Field (Washington), a private airport